Elizabeth Spencer (July 19, 1921 – December 22, 2019) was an American writer. Spencer's first novel, Fire in the Morning, was published in 1948. She wrote a total of nine novels, seven collections of short stories, a memoir (Landscapes of the Heart, 1998), and a play (For Lease or Sale, 1989). Her novella The Light in the Piazza (1960) was adapted for the screen in 1962 and transformed into a Broadway musical of the same name in 2005. She was a five-time recipient of the O. Henry Award for short fiction.

Spencer's themes relate to tension between the individual and the group, and deal with how family or community ties support but also bind the individual's identity. She writes about this as it concerns the inner lives of her female characters, many of whom struggle to establish a fruitful life independent of society's narrow restrictions.

Early life and career 
Born in Carrollton, Mississippi, Spencer was valedictorian of her graduating class at J. Z. George High School. She earned her BA at Belhaven College in Jackson, Mississippi and a master's in literature at Vanderbilt University in Nashville, Tennessee in 1943. At Vanderbilt, Spencer studied with Donald Davidson.

Spencer taught at the junior college level at Northwest Mississippi Community College in Senatobia, Mississippi for two years, then accepted a job with the Nashville Tennessean, but she soon returned to teaching, this time at the University of Mississippi in Oxford. In 1953, she was awarded a Guggenheim Fellowship and left Mississippi to live in Italy and pursue writing full-time.

Her third novel, begun in Florence, Italy, The Voice at the Back Door, was the finalist for the Pulitzer Prize for Fiction in 1957. The prize ultimately wasn't awarded that year.

After her first three novels set in Mississippi, Spencer's career foundered for a while, for she was seen as a "Southern woman" writer, and not a literary figure. In 1981 Spencer published her collected Stories, with a foreword by Eudora Welty, and her standing was reestablished among critics, who took another look at her contributions.

Personal life 
While in Italy, she met and married John Rusher of Cornwall, England. The couple moved to Montreal, Quebec in 1956, where they remained until moving to Chapel Hill, North Carolina in 1986. She taught creative writing at Concordia University in Montreal, and at the University of North Carolina at Chapel Hill until her retirement. Rusher died in 1998, and Spencer continued to live in her Chapel Hill home until her death on 22 December 2019.

Spencer, through her mother's family, was a cousin of United States senator John McCain.

Awards and honors

 Sidney Lanier Prize for Southern Literature, awarded by Mercer University, 2014
 Lifetime Achievement Award of the Mississippi Institute of Arts and Letters, 2009
 PEN/Malamud Award for Short Fiction, 2007
 Governor's Award for Achievement in Literature from the Mississippi Arts Commission, 2006
 The William Faulkner Medal for Literary Excellence, awarded by The Faulkner House Society, New Orleans, 2002
 Inducted into the North Carolina Hall of Fame, 2002
 Thomas Wolfe Award for Literature given by the University of North Carolina at Chapel Hill and the Morgan Foundation, 2002
 Cleanth Brooks Medal for achievement awarded by the Fellowship of Southern Writers, 2001
 Mississippi State Library Association Award for non-fiction, 1999
 Fortner Award for Literature, St. Andrews Presbyterian College, Laurinburg, North Carolina, 1998
 Richard Wright Literary Excellence Award for fiction, 1997
 J. William Corrington Award for fiction, Centenary College, Shreveport, Louisiana, 1997
 Charter Member Fellowship of Southern Writers, 1987; Vice-Chancellor, 1993–1997
 North Carolina Governor's Award for Literature, 1994
 John Dos Passos Award for Literature, 1992
 Salem Award for Distinction in Letters, Salem College, 1992
 National Endowment for the Arts Senior Fellowship in Literature Grant, 1988
 Election to the American Institute (now American Academy) of Arts and Letters, 1985
 Award of Merit Medal for the Short Story, American Academy, 1983
 National Endowment for the Arts Fellowship, 1983
 Bellaman Award, 1968
 Donnelly Fellowship, Bryn Mawr College, 1962
 McGraw-Hill Fiction Fellowship, 1960
 First Rosenthal Award, American Academy, 1957
 Kenyon Review Fiction Fellowship, 1956–57
 Guggenheim Foundation Fellowship, 1953
 Recognition Award, American Academy of Arts and Letters, 1952
Mississippi Writers Trail historical marker, 2019

Works

Novels 
 Fire in the Morning (1948, Dodd, Mead / 2012, University Press of Mississippi)
 This Crooked Way (1952, Dodd, Mead / 2012, University Press of Mississippi)
 The Voice at the Back Door (1956, McGraw-Hill / 1994, Louisiana State University Press)
 Knights and Dragons (1965, McGraw-Hill)
 No Place for an Angel (1967, McGraw-Hill / 2020, Liveright)
 The Snare (1972, McGraw-Hill;  / 2012, University Press of Mississippi)
 The Salt Line (1984, Doubleday;  / 1995, Louisiana State University Press)
 The Night Travellers (1991, Viking Press;  / 2012, University Press of Mississippi)

Short story collections 
 Ship Island and Other Stories (1968, McGraw-Hill) 
 The Stories of Elizabeth Spencer (1981, Doubleday;  / 1983, Penquin Books)
 Marilee: Three Stories (1981, University Press of Mississippi)
 Jack of Diamonds and Other Stories (1988, Viking Press;  / 1989, Penquin Books)
 On the Gulf (1991, University Press of Mississippi) 
 The Light in the Piazza and Other Italian Tales (1960, McGraw-Hill / 1996, University Press of Mississippi)
 The Southern Woman (2001, The Modern Library;  / 2009, The Modern Library;  / 2021, The Modern Library)
 Starting Over (2014, Liveright;  / 2020, Liveright)

Memoir 
 Landscapes of the Heart: A Memoir (1997, Random House;  / 2003, Louisiana State University Press)

Play 
 For Lease or Sale (1989; produced by Playmakers, UNC Chapel Hill, 1989)

Collection
 Elizabeth Spencer: Novels & Stories: The Voice at the Back Door / The Light in the Piazza / Knights and Dragons / Stories (Library of America, June 1, 2021)

References

External links 
 

 Archives of Elizabeth Spencer (Elizabeth Spencer fonds, R11813) are held at Library and Archives Canada

Novelists from Mississippi
American memoirists
American women dramatists and playwrights
People from Carrollton, Mississippi
People from Chapel Hill, North Carolina
McCain family
University of Mississippi alumni
1921 births
2019 deaths
University of North Carolina at Chapel Hill faculty
American expatriates in Canada
American expatriates in Italy
Belhaven University alumni
PEN/Malamud Award winners
American women novelists
American women short story writers
American women memoirists
20th-century American novelists
20th-century American dramatists and playwrights
20th-century American women writers
21st-century American women writers
National Endowment for the Arts Fellows
20th-century American short story writers
21st-century American short story writers
20th-century American non-fiction writers
21st-century American non-fiction writers